One Shangri-La Place is a residential development with twin residential towers situated in Mandaluyong, Metro Manila, Philippines. The building's podium also hosts a wing of the Shangri-La Plaza mall, which opened in 2014.

Architecture and design
Casas + Architects was the architecture firm behind One Shangri-La Place along with Hong Kong-based Palmer & Turner which served as architecture consultants. Hong Kong firms BTR Workshop Ltd. and Adrian L. Norman Ltd. were also involved with the former responsible for the retail and interior design and the latter for the Landscaping. Sy^2 + Associates were behind the buildings' superstructure while Aecom were behind their substructure. Meinhardt Phils was behind the MEPF (mechanical, electrical, plumbing and fire protection) of the buildings. Worktect worked with the lighting and Graphia for the signage designs.

The towers, the North and South Towers are 64-storeys above ground. A total of 14 high-speed passenger and service elevators are installed in the tower complex.

References

Skyscrapers in Ortigas Center
Residential skyscrapers in Metro Manila
Twin towers
Residential buildings completed in 2014